Paradise Heights may refer to:

Paradise Heights, Florida, a town in the United States
Paradise Heights, a BBC TV series, subsequently known as The Eustace Bros.